Dalelnagar is a town located in Auraiya district in the state of Uttar Pradesh, India.
The global coordinates are 26°39' North and 79°37' East.

This village was established by a Pathan, namely Dalel Khan whose grave is also situated in this village.

References
"Oalelnagar (Tahsil Auraiya)", District Gazetteer, (Uttar Pradesh), Chapter XIX

Cities and towns in Auraiya district